Panasonic Lumix DMC-TZ40 is a digital camera by Panasonic Lumix. The highest-resolution pictures it records is 18.1 megapixels. The camera Panasonic Lumix DMC-TZ40 is technically identical to the camera Panasonic Lumix DMC-TZ41.

Properties
Leica DC Vario-Elmar lens
20x optical zoom
High sensitivity MOS sensor
Hybrid O.I.S.+ (optical image stabilizer)

References

External links

Point-and-shoot cameras
TZ40